Mickey MacConnell (born 1947) is an Irish musician and songwriter.

Life and work
MacConnell was born in Bellanaleck near Enniskillen in County Fermanagh, Northern Ireland. He is the youngest member of a musical family. He worked in Dublin for Irish Press Group and, later, with The Irish Times.

MacConnell began writing songs very early in his life. In 1965, he wrote Only Our Rivers Run Free - a song that describes the natural world being damaged by the Irish border and that has been described by Stuart Bailie as "political but not hectoring".   This encouraged him to seriously devote himself to writing music when he moved to Listowel, County Kerry, where he lives with his wife, Maura.

MacConnell has released only two albums.
His first album, Peter Pan and Me, was released in 1992.
His second album, Joined Up Writing, was released in 2000.

See also
Music of Ireland

References

 

1947 births
Living people
Irish folk singers
Irish male singer-songwriters